Events from the year 1976 in Portuguese Macau.

Incumbents
 Governor - José Eduardo Martinho Garcia Leandro

Events

February
 17 February - The approval of Organic Statute of Macau.

References 

 
Years of the 20th century in Macau
Macau
Macau
1970s in Macau